Wood Island is a conspicuous rocky island in Hero Bay, Livingston Island in the South Shetland Islands, Antarctica lying southeast of Desolation Island and Miladinovi Islets and forming the south side of Blythe Bay.  Surface area .)  The area was frequented by early nineteenth century English and American sealers operating from Blythe Bay.

The feature's name derives from the name 'Wood Harbour' or 'Port Wood'  originally applied to Blythe Bay by Captain Robert Fildes in December 1820.

Location

See also 
 Composite Antarctic Gazetteer
 List of Antarctic islands south of 60° S
 SCAR
 Territorial claims in Antarctica

Map
 L.L. Ivanov et al., Antarctica: Livingston Island and Greenwich Island, South Shetland Islands (from English Strait to Morton Strait, with illustrations and ice-cover distribution), Scale 1:100000 map, Antarctic Place-names Commission of Bulgaria, Ministry of Foreign Affairs, Sofia, 2005

References

External links
 SCAR Composite Antarctic Gazetteer.

Islands of Livingston Island